Jan Petersen (born 11 June 1946, in Oslo) is a Norwegian politician for the Conservative Party. Petersen was elected to the Norwegian Parliament from Akershus in 1981, and was re-elected on six occasions. He had previously served as a deputy representative during the term 1973–1977. From 2001 to 2005, when the second cabinet Bondevik held office, Petersen was Minister of Foreign Affairs. During this period his seat in parliament was held by André Oktay Dahl.

On the local level Petersen was a member of Oppegård municipal council from 1967 to 1983, serving as mayor from 1975 to 1981.

He chaired the Conservative Party from 1994 to 2004. From 1971 to 1973 he was the leader of the Young Conservatives (Unge Høyre), the youth wing of the Conservative Party.

Outside politics Petersen has a cand.jur. degree from the University of Oslo in 1973. Before entering national politics he worked for a few years in the Norwegian Agency for Development Cooperation (Norad). From 2009 to 2014 he served as the Norwegian ambassador to Austria, and he then retired.

In 2004, Petersen was appointed a Commander with Star of the Order of St. Olav.

References

1946 births
Living people
Members of the Storting
Foreign Ministers of Norway
Mayors of places in Akershus
People from Oppegård
University of Oslo alumni
Ambassadors of Norway to Austria
Recipients of the Order of the Cross of Terra Mariana, 1st Class
Leaders of the Conservative Party (Norway)
21st-century Norwegian politicians
20th-century Norwegian politicians